Jamaree Bouyea (born June 27, 1999) is an American professional basketball player for the Sioux Falls Skyforce of the NBA G League. He played college basketball for the San Francisco Dons.

High school career
Bouyea played basketball for Palma School in Salinas, California. As a junior, he averaged 18 points and led his team to the Division IV state championship. In his senior season, he averaged 19.1 points and 6.1 assists per game. Bouyea became the first player in 18 seasons to repeat as The Monterey Herald All-County Player of the Year. He was lightly recruited and considered attending prep school for a fifth year. He accepted an offer from San Francisco, the only NCAA Division I program to offer him a basketball scholarship.

College career
As a freshman at San Francisco, Bouyea averaged 2.5 points per game, shooting 32.7 percent from the field. In his sophomore season, he averaged 6.2 points and 3.3 rebounds per game. He became a regular starter as a junior, averaging 12.2 points, 4.4 rebounds and 3.5 assists per game, and was selected to the All-West Coast Conference (WCC) Honorable Mention. On November 27, 2020, Bouyea led San Francisco to a 61–60 upset win against No. 4 Virginia, adding 19 points and six assists. On February 18, 2021, he scored a career-high 33 points in a 68–63 loss to Loyola Marymount. As a senior, Bouyea averaged 17.3 points, 3.7 assists and 3.7 rebounds per game, earning First Team All-WCC honors. He opted to return to college for a fifth season. Bouyea was again named to the First Team All-WCC in 2022. On March 17, 2022, Bouyea scored a career high 36 points during San Francisco's 92–87 overtime loss to Murray State during the opening round of the NCAA Tournament.

Professional career

Sioux Falls Skyforce (2022–2023)
After going undrafted in the 2022 NBA draft, Bouyea signed with the Miami Heat on July 14, 2022. He was waived on October 13. 

On October 24, 2022, Bouyea joined the Sioux Falls Skyforce training camp roster.

Miami Heat (2023)
On February 7, 2023, Bouyea signed a 10-day contract with the Miami Heat. Bouyea made his NBA debut against the Houston Rockets on February 10.

Return to Sioux Falls (2023)
On February 19, 2023, Bouyea was reacquired by the Sioux Falls Skyforce.

Washington Wizards (2023–present)
On March 3, 2023, Bouyea signed a 10-day contract with the Washington Wizards.

Career statistics

NBA

Regular season

|-
| style="text-align:left;"|
| style="text-align:left;"|Miami
| 4 || 0 || 16.3 || .462 || .400 || .500 || 1.3 || 1.0 || 1.0 || .5 || 3.8
|- class="sortbottom"
| style="text-align:center;" colspan="2"|Career
| 4 || 0 || 16.3 || .462 || .400 || .500 || 1.3 || 1.0 || 1.0 || .5 || 3.8
|- class="sortbottom"

College

|-
| style="text-align:left;"| 2017–18
| style="text-align:left;"| San Francisco
| 36 || 10 || 13.3 || .327 || .231 || .682 || 1.7 || .9 || .7 || .3 || 2.5
|-
| style="text-align:left;"| 2018–19
| style="text-align:left;"| San Francisco
| 31 || 2 || 23.0 || .467 || .306 || .654 || 3.3 || 1.3 || .9 || .5 || 6.2
|-
| style="text-align:left;"| 2019–20
| style="text-align:left;"| San Francisco
| 34 || 34 || 33.1 || .492 || .310 || .671 || 4.4 || 3.5 || 1.6 || .6 || 12.2
|-
| style="text-align:left;"| 2020–21
| style="text-align:left;"| San Francisco
| 25 || 25 || 33.7 || .500 || .370 || .754 || 3.6 || 3.8 || 1.6 || .2 || 17.3
|-
| style="text-align:left;"| 2021–22
| style="text-align:left;"| San Francisco
| 34 || 34 || 36.2 || .470 || .367 || .755 || 5.0 || 4.0 || 1.8 || .9 || 17.3
|- class="sortbottom"
| style="text-align:center;" colspan="2"| Career
| 160 || 105 || 27.5 || .472 || .337 || .712 || 3.6 || 2.6 || 1.3 || .5 || 10.7

See also
 List of NCAA Division I men's basketball career games played leaders

References

External links
San Francisco Dons bio

1999 births
Living people
American men's basketball players
Basketball players from California
Miami Heat players
People from Seaside, California
Point guards
San Francisco Dons men's basketball players
Shooting guards
Sioux Falls Skyforce players
Undrafted National Basketball Association players
Washington Wizards players